Al-Rumaitha Sport Club, is an Iraqi football team based in Al-Rumaitha District, Al-Muthanna, that plays in the Iraq Division Two.

Managerial history
 Alaa Nima
 Ghiath Malik
 Abdul-Hussein Bashi

See also 
 1996–97 Iraq FA Cup
 2000–01 Iraqi Elite League
 2001–02 Iraq FA Cup

References

External links
 Al-Rumaitha SC on Goalzz.com
 Iraq Clubs- Foundation Dates

1967 establishments in Iraq
Association football clubs established in 1967
Football clubs in Muthanna